Strategic Organization''' may refer to:

 Strategic Organization (journal), an academic journal
 the study of strategic management from an organizational studies viewpoint (as distinct from an economics viewpoint
 the process'' of organizing in a way that is strategically effective – i.e., promotes the broad goals of the organization